Atractus paucidens, Despax's ground snake, is a species of snake in the family Colubridae. The species can be found in Ecuador.

References 

Atractus
Endemic fauna of Ecuador
Reptiles of Ecuador
Snakes of South America
Reptiles described in 1910